Mário de Carvalho (15 March 1905 – deceased) was a Portuguese footballer who played as forward.

Football career 
Carvalho gained two caps for Portugal, making his debut on 15 May 1925 in Lisbon against Spain, in a 0–2 defeat.

External links 
 
 

1905 births
Portuguese footballers
Association football forwards
S.L. Benfica footballers
Portugal international footballers
Year of death missing